The canton of Saint-Jean-d'Angély is an administrative division of the Charente-Maritime department, western France. Its borders were modified at the French canton reorganisation which came into effect in March 2015. Its seat is in Saint-Jean-d'Angély.

It consists of the following communes:

Annepont
Annezay
Archingeay
Bernay-Saint-Martin
Bignay
Bords
Champdolent
Chantemerle-sur-la-Soie
Courant
La Croix-Comtesse
La Devise
Dœuil-sur-le-Mignon
Essouvert
Fenioux
Grandjean
La Jarrie-Audouin
Landes
Loulay
Lozay
Mazeray
Migré
Le Mung
Nachamps
Les Nouillers
Puy-du-Lac
Puyrolland
Saint-Crépin
Saint-Félix
Saint-Jean-d'Angély
Saint-Loup
Saint-Savinien
Taillant
Taillebourg
Ternant
Tonnay-Boutonne
Torxé
La Vergne
Vergné
Villeneuve-la-Comtesse
Voissay

References

Cantons of Charente-Maritime